Tree and Leaf is a small book published in 1964, containing two works by J. R. R. Tolkien: 
 a revised version of an essay called "On Fairy-Stories" (originally published in 1947 in Essays Presented to Charles Williams)
 an allegorical short story called "Leaf by Niggle" (originally published in the Dublin Review in 1945).

Tree and Leaf was the first publication in which On Fairy-Stories and Leaf by Niggle became readily available to the general public. The book was originally illustrated by Pauline Baynes.

"Mythopoeia" was added to the 1988 edition. Later versions also include "The Homecoming of Beorhtnoth Beorhthelm's Son".

Both pieces were re-issued in the collection The Tolkien Reader (1966), and have also appeared in various subsequent collections.

References

External links
Tolkien Library

Collections of works by J. R. R. Tolkien
1964 books
Fantasy short stories
1964 short stories
British novellas
Books of literary criticism
Allen & Unwin books